Jayson Vélez Jiménez (born March 9, 1988) is a Puerto Rican professional boxer who challenged for the IBF featherweight title in 2014.

Professional career

WBC Silver Featherweight Championship
Velez beat Salvador Sánchez II for the vacant WBC Silver Featherweight Championship.

Professional boxing record

References

1988 births
Living people
People from Caguas, Puerto Rico
Puerto Rican male boxers
Super-featherweight boxers